Dina Aspandiyarova, (born 10 July 1976 in Almaty, Kazakhstan) is a professional sporting shooter who has previously represented Kazakhstan and Russia and currently represents Australia in international competition. Aspandiyarova is from Tatar descent.

Aspandiyarova competed at the 2000 Summer Olympics in Sydney where she finished 6th in the women's 10 metre air pistol. She moved to Russia with husband Anatoly Babushkin in 2001 and moved to Australia in 2003 when Babushkin was appointed Australian national shooting coach. She missed out on selection in the Russian team for the 2004 Summer Olympics and the following year became an Australian citizen.

She competed at the 2008 Summer Olympics in Beijing where she placed 33rd in the women's 25 metre pistol and 36th in the women's 10m air pistol.

She competed at the 2010 Commonwealth Games in Delhi, winning two medals.

She was selected for the Australian team for the 2012 Summer Olympics in London, and finished in 14th place in the women's 10 metre air pistol event.

She qualified to represent Australia at the 2020 Summer Olympics. She competed in the individual and team 10m air pistol events. She did not score sufficient points to advance past qualification. Detailed results can be found in Australia at the 2020 Summer Olympics.

References

1976 births
Living people
Sportspeople from Almaty
Australian female sport shooters
Kazakhstani female sport shooters
Shooters at the 2000 Summer Olympics
Shooters at the 2008 Summer Olympics
Shooters at the 2012 Summer Olympics
Olympic shooters of Australia
Olympic shooters of Kazakhstan
Shooters at the 2010 Commonwealth Games
Commonwealth Games silver medallists for Australia
Commonwealth Games bronze medallists for Australia
Asian Games medalists in shooting
Shooters at the 1994 Asian Games
Shooters at the 1998 Asian Games
Asian Games gold medalists for Kazakhstan
Asian Games silver medalists for Kazakhstan
Asian Games bronze medalists for Kazakhstan
Commonwealth Games medallists in shooting
Medalists at the 1994 Asian Games
Medalists at the 1998 Asian Games
Shooters at the 2020 Summer Olympics
Tatar sportspeople
Naturalised citizens of Australia
Medallists at the 2010 Commonwealth Games